Weichert is a surname. Notable people with the surname include:

 Dieter Weichert (born 1948), German mechanical engineer
 Florian Weichert (born 1968), German footballer
 Konrad Weichert, German sailor

See also
 Wiechert (surname)

Surnames of German origin